Armaniidae was a name formerly given to a group of extinct ant-like hymenopterans known from a series of Cretaceous fossils found in Asia and Africa.  Armaniidae has been suggested by several authors to belong to the family Formicidae as one of the stem-group subfamilies, Armaniinae; however, this position has not been taken up by myrmecologists.  The family contained seven described genera and thirteen described species. An analysis of fossil ants based on antenna structure in 2017 resulted in three of the family being broken up with some genera being moved to Sphecomyrminae and other genera being relegated to incertae sedis in Formicidae or Aculeata.

History and classification
Armaniidae was sometimes treated as the most basal of the Formicidae subfamilies, and classed as a stem-group which is more distant in relation to modern ants than the next stem group, Sphecomyrminae.  More often the group, treated as "ant-like wasps", was elevated to the rank of family, and considered as a possible sister group to Formicidae. It has been suggested by Engel and Grimaldi that the group may be paraphyletic.  This position is in contrast to the original hypothesis of Russian paleoentomologist Gennady Dlussky, who first described the family.  Dlussky considered the group, when erected in 1983, have been an intermediate family bridging the families Scoliidae and the true formicids.  In contrast to both the treatment as a separate family and as a distinct subfamily, entomologist E. O. Wilson, in a 1987 paper, suggested that the then known armaniids and Sphecomyrma represented a single species.  Wilson, in synonymizing the groups, made the hypothesis that the different described genera were actually fossils of different castes of the same species, with Sphecomyrma freyi being workers, Armania robusta being queens, and "Paleomyrmex" zherichini as the winged males.  This view was rejected as new fossils and species were described.

The group is known exclusively from impression fossils, which have a limited preservation quality, leading to the uncertainty of what features are present in the described species.  Overall armaniids have a poorly developed petiole which is broadly attached to the thorax, short scapes on the antennae, and queen-like looking females.  The mandibles are vespid like, with possibly only one or two teeth, though this may be an artifact of preservation.  The short scape is a feature that is also seen in Sphecomyrminae members, and does not exclude armaniids from Formicidae.  Similarly the petiole is a feature that is seen in both the true formicids, and in the extinct chrysidoid wasp family Falsiformicidae, which is not related to formicids at all.  The two defining features of the true formicids are considered to be the presence of females which are divided into adult workers and queens. Currently no worker like armaniid specimens are known for the described species.  The presence of metapleural glands in some fossils has been reported by Dlussky,± but the veracity of the presence is uncertain.

A review of the Cretaceous ant groups was performed by Borysenko in 2017 leading to the breakup of Armaniidae, with the three genera Armania, Orapia, and Pseudarmania being moved to Sphecomyrminae.  The genera Archaeopone and Poneropterus were considered as incertae sedis in Formicidae, and the genera Dolichomyrma and Khetania were removed from the family entirely as incertae sedis in Aculeata.

Genera and species
Archaeopone Dlussky, 1975
Archaeopone kzylzharica Dlussky, 1975
Archaeopone taylori Dlussky, 1983
Armania Dlussky, 1983  (jr synonym = "Armaniella" Dlussky, 1983)
Armania capitata Dlussky, 1983
Armania curiosa (Dlussky, 1983)
Armania pristina Dlussky, 1983
Armania robusta Dlussky, 1983
Dolichomyrma Dlussky, 1975
Dolichomyrma latipes Dlussky, 1975
Dolichomyrma longiceps Dlussky, 1975
Khetania Dlussky, 1999
Khetania mandibulata Dlussky, 1999
Orapia Dlussky, Brothers & Rasnitsyn, 2004
Orapia minor Dlussky, Brothers & Rasnitsyn, 2004
Orapia rayneri Dlussky, Brothers & Rasnitsyn, 2004
Poneropterus Dlussky, 1983
Poneropterus sphecoides Dlussky, 1983
Pseudarmania Dlussky, 1983
Pseudarmania aberrans Dlussky, 1983
Pseudarmania rasnitsyni Dlussky, 1983

References

†
Cretaceous insects
Fossil ant taxa
Cenomanian first appearances
Turonian extinctions